Buticolotrema is a genus of trematodes in the family Opecoelidae.

Species
Buticulotrema stenauchenus Blend, Dronen & McEachran, 1993
Buticulotrema thermichthysi Bray, Waeschenbach, Dyal, Littlewood & Morand, 2014

References

Opecoelidae
Plagiorchiida genera